Aspen Medical is an Australian-based health service company with operations in Australia and internationally. The company headquarters are in Canberra with regional offices in Brisbane and Perth. In 2020, the company recorded a total turnover of A$529,113,202, with taxable income of A$157,424,342, and paid A$47,136,454 corporate tax. In 2018, Aspen Medical was recognized as the Australian Exporter of the Year, and in 2021 was inducted into the Australian Export Hall of Fame.

History 
Aspen was established in 2003 by Glenn Keys and Dr Andrew Walker. Its initial work involved reviewing the delivery of orthopedic services under the Blair Governments' National Health Service Reforms, and reducing waiting lists for orthopedic surgery.  Subsequently, the firm medically supported the Australian-led mission to stabilize the Solomon Islands after its civil collapse, and assisted the Australian-led international Military Mission to East Timor, which included saving President Jose Ramos Horta’s life after an assassination attempt.

Aspen has worked in remote areas in Australia through: developing the Western Australia Resources Aero Medical Evacuation for seven oil and gas companies working in the North West Shelf off WA; establishing the Remote Area Health Corps to provide Primary Health Care to remote indigenous communities in the Northern Territory in 2008;, supporting an existing joint venture between CareFlight and Pel-Air to provide air  ambulance services out of Darwin International Airport and, administering the Australian Government’s Nursing and Allied Health Rural Locum Scheme (NAHRLS). This scheme provides short term locum staff to rural and remote locations in Australia to relieve permanent residential staff undertaking professional development or taking leave.

Since 2012 the firm has provided sub-contracted services with approximately 1000 staff in over fifty Defence sites Australia-wide.

In 2013, Aspen Medical employed more than 2000 staff and had a turnover of around $163,000,000 AUD.

2014–15 West Africa Ebola outbreak

Aspen Medical managed the Australian Government's response to the Ebola virus disease (EVD). This response involved commissioning and managing a 100-bed Ebola Treatment Centre (ETC), constructed by the UK Government in Sierra Leone. Aspen Medical managed the ETC from December 2014 to April 2015.

The Sierra Leone ETC admitted 216 patients. In addition to the Ebola survivors, the ETC contributed to the treatment of 120 survivors of serious conditions other than Ebola.

Four Corners investigative report 
In May 2022, Aspen Medical featured on the ABC’s programme Four Corners. The episode alleged the company’s involvement in financial misconduct whilst acting as a sub-contractor to EN-Projects, the prime contractor for the construction of Hambantota Hospital, during the Presidency of Mahinda Rajapaksa in 2012. One of the transactions in question was a payment made to Sabre Vision Holdings, owned by Nimal Perera, a Sri Lankan businessman who also has close ties with the Rajapaksa family. Perera has since served legal notice of a defamation case to the ABC for the accusations.

Shortly after the Four Corners episode aired, Aspen Medical issued a Media Release in response to the allegations which attempted to clarify the nature of the work they are involved in. Aspen Medical stated that the delivery of services in Sri Lanka was verified, and the payments authorised by EN-Projects. The company noted that it heard about the allegations five years after the contract concluded in 2015, and that the controversy appears to relate to events unrelated to the Hambantota hospital project. The document released by Aspen Medical provides links to their standards and policies including; Aspen’s WHO accreditation, external audits, International Operating Standards, and their Corporate Social Responsibility outline. Aspen Medical maintains that they are “strongly against corruption or corrupt practices wherever we work in the world” and that it is not involved in any international money laundering investigation arising from its involvement in the Hambantota General Hospital project.

Operations 
Aspen Medical has been operating in the United Arab Emirates since 2003. In August 2022, Aspen Medical opened one of six planned primary health centers in Abu Dhabi, United Arab Emirates. The rural primary health centers are jointly operated in coordination with the Department of Health (Abu Dhabi) as part of governmental plans to expand primary health care in the Emirate of Abu Dhabi.

Awards 
Aspen Medical has received numerous awards for their work as an industry service provider including:

2022

 Financial Review Best Places to Work List Honoree

2021 

 National Export Hall of Fame Inductee 
 Financial Review Best Places to Work List Honoree

2020 

 International Project Management Association Silver Medal for the Canberra COVID-19 Surge Facility

2019 

 B Lab Best for The World - Customers Category

2018 

 Australian Export Awards - Australian Exporter of the Year 
 Australian Export Awards - Health & Biotechnology Category Winner 
 ACT Chief Minister's Exporter of the Year Health & Biotechnology Category Winner 
 B Lab Best for the World - Customers Category  
 International Stability Operations Association (ISOA) Vanguard Award for Mission to Mosul

2017 
ACT Chief Minister's Exporter of the Year Overall Winner 

ACT Chief Minister's Exporter of the Year Health & Biotechnology Category Winner 

International Stability Operations Association (ISOA) Vanguard Award for Ebola Response in West Africa

2016 
International Project Management Association Gold Medal for Ebola Response in West Africa 

EY Entrepreneur of the Year - National Winner  

EY Entrepreneur of the Year - Services Category  

University of Newcastle Alumni Award - National Leadership 

ACT Chief Minister's Exporter of the Year Health & Biotechnology Category Winner 

Australian Institute of Management - Community Leader of the Year  

EY Entrepreneur of the Year - Eastern Region Winner

2015 
BRW Aspire Private Business Growth & Transformation Category Winner ($100 Million +) 

APFPM Internationally Funded Humanitarian Aid Project of the Year Winner 

ACT Chief Minister's Exporter of the Year Winner 

ACT Chief Minister's Export Awards Health & Biotechnology Category Winner 

Concur Client Innovation Award Winner (Australia and New Zealand) 

AIPM Internationally Funded Humanitarian Aid Project of the Year (National Winner) 

AIPM (ACT Chapter) Project of the Year Winner 

AIPM (ACT Chapter) Internationally Funded Humanitarian Aid Projects Category Winner 

HRD magazine Employer of Choice 

Export Council of Australia - Export Hero

2014 
ACT Chief Minister's Export Awards - Biotechnology & Health Category Winner 

EY Entrepreneur of the Year Global Hall of Fame 

Australian Anthill Smart 100

2013 
Australian Export Awards - Biotechnology & Health Category Winner 

Adelaide Research & Innovation - Innovation Champion Award (Winner) 

ACT Chief Minister’s Exporter of the Year Award (Overall Winner) 

ACT Chief Minister’s Export Awards - Biotechnology & Health Category Winner

2012 
ACT Chief Minister’s Exporter of the Year Award (Overall Winner) 

ACT Chief Minister’s Export Awards – Large Services Category Winner 

Australian Institute of Project Management’s ACT Chapter’s Regional Development Award 

ACT & SE NSW – Defence Reserves Support Council, Private Sector Employer of the Year Award

2011 
ACT Chief Minister’s Exporter Hall of Fame Award 

National Exporter of the Year - Small to Medium Business Category Winner 

ACT Chief Minister’s Exporter of the Year Award (Overall Winner)

2010 
Winner ACT Chief Minister's Inclusion Awards

2009 
BRW’s Most Successful Private Company in Australia (turnover under $100M)

2008 
iAward Regional Winner – e-Health Division 

PriceWaterhouseCoopers Antill Magazine Cool Company Awards

2007 
ACT Chief Minister’s Export Awards - Services Category Winner 

ACT Chief Minister’s Exporter of the Year Award (Overall Winner) 

BRW Fastest Growing SME under $100M

2006 
Entrepreneur of the Year

References

Health care companies of Australia
Private providers of NHS services